The Value Line Composite Index was launched on the Kansas City Board of Trade (KCBT) in 1982, pioneering the first market index to trade futures market, ushering in a ground-breaking approach to risk management. KCBOT dropped the Value Line indices (Arithmetic and Geometric) effective 30th Aug 2013 and shifted the exchange distribution to NYSE’s Global Index Feed.

Companies in the Value Line Index
The total number of companies in the Value Line Composite Index hovers near 1681, and is composed of the same companies as The Value Line Investment Survey®, excluding closed-end funds. The Value Line Composite Index has two forms, the Value Line Geometric Composite Index or the Value Line Arithmetic Composite Index, as defined below.

All companies in the Value Line Composite Index are publicly listed [1] on one of the major exchanges listed below. The number of companies in the Value Line Composite Index fluctuates based on factors including: the addition or delisting of the companies on the exchanges themselves, mergers, acquisitions, bankruptcies, and the coverage decisions made by Value Line for the Value Line Composite Index. Value Line’s decisions as to which companies to include are undertaken with the intention to create a broad representation of the North American equity market.

Additionally, the number of companies listed on any given exchange may vary, as a company may move from one exchange to another or be added or delisted.
 
In sum, it is noteworthy to recognize the addition, delisting or movement of companies on the exchanges are not factors in the Value Line Composite Index methodology, regardless, whether the Geometric or Arithmetic calculation is employed.

Exchanges in The Value Line Composite Index are:
 American Stock Exchange
 NASDAQ
 New York Stock Exchange
 Toronto Stock Exchange

Value Line (Geometric) Average 

The Value Line Geometric Composite Index is the original index released, and launched on June 30, 1961. It is an equally weighted index using a geometric average. Because it is based on a geometric average the daily change is closest to the median stock price change.

The daily price change of the Value Line Geometric Composite Index is found by multiplying the ratio of each stock's closing price to its previous closing price, and raising that result to the reciprocal of the total number of stocks.

Value Line (Arithmetic) Average 

The Value Line Arithmetic Composite Index was established on February 1, 1988, using the arithmetic mean to more closely mimic the change in the index if you held a portfolio of stocks in equal amounts. 
The daily price change of the Value Line Arithmetic Composite Index is calculated by adding the daily percent change of all the stocks, and then dividing by the total number of stocks.

External links
 Value Line Arithmetic Index Current and Historical Prices
 Value Line Geometric Index Current and Historical Prices

References

American stock market indices